Munna may refer to:
 Saint Munna, a 6th-century saint of the Roman Catholic church in Ireland, patron of two churches
 Munna (1954 film), an Indian Hindi-language film
 Munna (2007 film), an Indian Telugu-language film
 Munna (actor), Indian film actor
 Munna (Pokémon)